Electoral district of Balwyn was an electoral district of the Legislative Assembly in the Australian state of Victoria. It centered on the eastern Melbourne suburb of Balwyn.

Members for Balwyn

Election results

External links

Former electoral districts of Victoria (Australia)
1955 establishments in Australia
1992 disestablishments in Australia
Constituencies established in 1955
Constituencies disestablished in 1992